Ganguvari Sigadam is a village in Srikakulam district of the Indian state of Andhra Pradesh.
Surya Yalakala

See also
Batuva

References

Villages in Srikakulam district
Mandal headquarters in Srikakulam district